Ritvik Arora (born 22 October 1997) is an Indian television actor. He made his acting debut when he portrayed Ahaan Dhanrajgir in Tu Aashiqui and is best known for Yeh Rishtey Hain Pyaar Ke as Kunal Rajvansh.

Early life 
Ritvik was born in Delhi on 22 October 1997. Arora attended St. Columba's School and later went to Sri Guru Gobind Singh College of Commerce at the University of Delhi, for his undergraduate studies. In 2015, he was one of the winners of the Delhi Times Fresh Face of the Year. He was in college when he was selected for his television debut in 2017 and moved to Mumbai to pursue his career in acting.

Career

Arora made his television debut when he portrayed the lead role of Ahaan Dhanrajgir in Colors TV's romantic drama Tu Aashiqui (2017–18).

His second show was Star Plus's soap Yeh Rishtey Hain Pyaar Ke where he was cast as Kunal Rajvansh from March 2019 to July 2020.

Filmography

Television

Awards

See also 

 List of Indian television actors

References

External links

Living people
Indian male television actors
1997 births
Indian male soap opera actors
Indian television actors
People from Delhi